The 2009 Challenger Varonil Britania Zavaleta was a professional tennis tournament played on outdoor hard courts. It was the fourteenth edition of the tournament which was part of the 2009 ATP Challenger Tour. It took place in Puebla, Mexico between 23 and 29 November 2009.

ATP entrants

Seeds

 Rankings are as of November 16, 2009.

Other entrants
The following players received wildcards into the singles main draw:
  Tigre Hank
  Greg Ouellette
  César Ramírez
  Raúl-Isaias Rosas-Zarur

The following players received entry from the qualifying draw:
  Richard Bloomfield
  Bruno Rodríguez
  Víctor Romero
  Nima Roshan

Champions

Singles

 Ramón Delgado def.  Andre Begemann, 6–3, 6–4

Doubles

 Vasek Pospisil /  Adil Shamasdin def.  Guillermo Olaso /  Pere Riba, 7–6(7), 6–0

External links
ITF search 
2009 Draws

Challenger Varonil Britania Zavaleta
Challenger Britania Zavaleta
Mex